The 1975–76 California Golden Seals season would be the Seals' ninth and final season in the Bay Area of California. The Seals were led by rookie Dennis Maruk.

Maruk centered the 3M line with Bob Murdoch and Al MacAdam. Both Maruk and MacAdam scored over 30 goals while Murdoch led the team in power play goals. Although they recorded a solid improvement over the previous season, the Seals fell 7 points shy of a playoff spot.

Owner Mel Swig was counting on the construction of a new arena in San Francisco, but after the proposal was defeated, he was convinced by minority owner George Gund III to relocate the franchise to Cleveland, where it was renamed Cleveland Barons.  The NHL returned to the Bay Area fifteen years later, when the San Jose Sharks entered via expansion.

Offseason

Amateur Draft

Regular season

Final standings

Schedule and results

Player statistics

Skaters
Note: GP = Games played; G = Goals; A = Assists; Pts = Points; PIM = Penalties in minutes

†Denotes player spent time with another team before joining Seals. Stats reflect time with the Seals only. ‡Traded mid-season

Goaltenders
Note: GP = Games played; TOI = Time on ice (minutes); W = Wins; L = Losses; T = Ties; GA = Goals against; SO = Shutouts; GAA = Goals against average

Transactions
The Seals were involved in the following transactions during the 1975–76 season:

Trades

Additions and subtractions

Playoffs
The Seals did not qualify for the playoffs

References
 Seals on Hockey Database
 Seals on Database Hockey

California Golden Seals seasons
Cali
Cali
Calif
Calif